Cordulegaster princeps is a species of dragonfly in the family Cordulegastridae. It is endemic to Morocco.  Its natural habitat is rivers. It is threatened by habitat loss.

References

Insects of North Africa
Cordulegastridae
Endemic fauna of Morocco
Insects described in 1915
Taxonomy articles created by Polbot